Rimexolone is a glucocorticoid steroid used to treat inflammation in the eye. It is marketed as a 1% eye drop suspension under the trade name Vexol by Alcon Laboratories, but was discontinued in the US and other countries.

Medical uses
Rimexolone is used to treat inflammation after eye surgery, to treat anterior uveitis, conjunctivitis and keratitis.

Contraindications
The substance is contraindicated in herpes simplex and most other viral eye infections, as well as mycobacterial, fungal and amoebal eye infections because it only reduces the inflammation but does not act against such microorganisms.

Side effects
The most common adverse effects are blurred vision, tearing and other kinds of eye discomfort. Eye pain, eye oedema, headache, increased intraocular pressure and other side effects are seen in less than 1% of patients.

Pharmacology

Pharmacodynamics

As a glucocorticoid, rimexolone acts as an agonist of the glucocorticoid receptor.

Pharmacokinetics
A small amount of rimexolone is absorbed into the systemic circulation. On hourly treatment with the eye drops for a week, blood serum concentrations peaked at 150 pg/ml on average, with many patients remaining below the detection threshold of 80 pg/ml. The elimination half-life from the circulation is estimated at one to two hours; the substance is mainly (over 80%) excreted via the faeces.

References

Alcohols
CYP3A4 inducers
Diketones
Glucocorticoids
Pregnanes